Scituate High School may refer to:

 Scituate High School (Massachusetts)
 Scituate High School (Rhode Island)